On June 19, 1981, residents of Edmonton were asked a series of plebiscite questions.

Background

During the fall of 1980, a group calling itself the Save City Hall Committee presented a petition to Cal McGonigle, Edmonton's City Clerk, asking that the City Hall be designated as a municipal historic building.  McGonigle rejected the petition on the basis of insufficient signatures.  This decision was overruled by the Court of Queen's Bench of Alberta in January 1981, and the petition was declared valid.  McGonigle, acting independently of City Council, appealed the ruling on the basis that it could cause "ambiguity about the authority of all city clerks in Alberta in respect to legislation governing petitions."

Council gave first reading to the plebiscite on April 8, with the vote to be held May 10; this date was changed to June 19 when Council discovered that information on the design of the proposed new city hall wouldn't be available in time for a May 10 plebiscite.

In addition to the question on which the Save City Hall Committee had sought a vote, council added two questions of its own, the first dealing with how the city should deal with the need for increased municipal office space and the second asking for the electorate's views on the ward system.

Results

Designating City Hall as a Historical Building

Are you in favour of bylaw No. 6403, a bylaw to designate a building within the City of Edmonton and known as the "City Hall", a Municipal Historic Building to be preserved and used by the City?
Yes - 21172
No - 21867

Municipal Office Space

There are three basic options to house the Civic Government in the downtown area. These are listed below. Please choose one only.

a.  Build a new City Hall on same site, according to the design selected in the recent Architectural Competition - 14126

b.  Retain and renovate the present City Hall and construct an extension to use the space between 102A Avenue and the CN Tower to incorporate the theme of the design selected in the recent Architectural Competition - 19115

c.  Retain the present City Hall and continue to lease office space as required - 11099

520 ballots were rejected.

Ward System

Before 1971, there were no wards and Alderman were elected at large. For example, if there were 40 candidates for City Council, all 40 names would appear on the ballot and the 12 receiving the largest number of votes were elected. In 1971, four wards with three Aldermen each were set up. Voters in each ward voted only for the candidates competing for the positions in that ward. In 1980, the number of wards was increased to six, with two Alderman each.

Are you in favour of the Ward System? (VOTE YES or NO ONLY)

Yes - 35711
No - 7988

117 ballots were rejected.

If your answer is yes, do you favour one of the following?  (Vote for one if you voted "Yes" above)

Existing Ward Size - 17383
Smaller Wards - 14315
Larger Wards - 2502

There were 2853 ballots rejected.

References
City of Edmonton: Edmonton Elections

1981
Edmonton municipal plebiscite
Edmonton municipal plebiscite
Edmonton municipal plebiscite